Ccotanca or Ccotancca is a populated place in Huancavelica Region, Peru.

See also
Huaytará

References

Populated places in the Huancavelica Region